War at the Wall Street Journal is the first book released by author and journalist Sarah Ellison, published on May 12, 2010. The book is an account of Rupert Murdoch's purchase of the Wall Street Journal from the Bancroft family in 2007. Ellison, a former Journal reporter, was at the paper during the takeover.

Reception 
War at the Wall Street Journal was met with mostly positive reviews. It was profiled in the New York Times, the Washington Post, Financial Times, Publishers Weekly, Booklist, and others. Ellison was particularly praised for her storytelling style, with The New York Times saying that the book was a "definitive, indeed cinematic, account."

References

2010 non-fiction books
Books about companies
The Wall Street Journal
Houghton Mifflin books